The 2021 Dead On Tools 250 was a NASCAR Xfinity Series race that was held on October 30, 2021, at the Martinsville Speedway in Martinsville, Virginia. Contested over 250 laps on the  oval, it was the 32nd race of the 2021 NASCAR Xfinity Series season, the sixth race of the Playoffs, and the final race of the Round of 8. JR Motorsports driver Noah Gragson, in a must-win situation to advance to the Round of 4, collected his third win of the season.

Report

Background 
Martinsville Speedway is an NASCAR-owned stock car racing track located in Henry County, in Ridgeway, Virginia, just to the south of Martinsville. At  in length, it is the shortest track in the NASCAR Xfinity Series. The track was also one of the first paved oval tracks in NASCAR, being built in 1947 by H. Clay Earles. It is also the only remaining race track that has been on the NASCAR circuit from its beginning in 1948.

Entry list 

 (R) denotes rookie driver.
 (i) denotes driver who is ineligible for series driver points.

Qualifying
Austin Cindric was awarded the pole for the race as determined by competition-based formula. Timmy Hill did not have enough points to qualify for the race.

Starting Lineups

Race

Race results

Stage Results 
Stage One
Laps: 60

Stage Two
Laps: 60

Final Stage Results 

Laps: 130

Race statistics 

 Lead changes: 13 among 6 different drivers
 Cautions/Laps: 13 for 75
 Time of race: 2 hours, 10 minutes, and 48 seconds
 Average speed:

References 

NASCAR races at Martinsville Speedway
2021 NASCAR Xfinity Series
2021 in sports in Virginia
Dead On Tools 250